Rhabdophis siamensis is a keelback snake in the family Colubridae found in Thailand, Vietnam and China.

References

Rhabdophis
Snakes of Southeast Asia
Reptiles of Vietnam
Reptiles described in 1931